Mowasseseh-ye Gavdari Salehpur (also Romanized as Mowasseseh-ye Gāvdārī Şāleḥpūr) is a village in Jahangiri Rural District, in the Central District of Masjed Soleyman County, Khuzestan Province, Iran. At the 2006 census, its population was 24, in 6 families.

References 

Populated places in Masjed Soleyman County